Dactylothece is a genus of green algae, in the family Coccomyxaceae.

References

External links

Trebouxiophyceae genera
Trebouxiophyceae